Al-Idrus Football Club is a football club based in Bandar Seri Begawan, Brunei Darussalam. The youth department Al-Idrus Junior won the Brunei Premier League in 2016.

Honours
Al Idrus
Unida CF Trophy: 2016
Al-Idrus FA Cup: 2019

Al-Idrus Junior
NFABD TelBru Youth Under-16 National Football League: 2013
NBT FA Cup: 2014 (runners-up)
Brunei-Muara District Football League: 2015
Brunei Premier League: 2016

Al-Idrus FC (veteran)
 Brunei Veteran Football Association FA Cup: 2014, 2015 (runners-up), 2018
 Brunei Veteran Football Association President's Cup: 2016 (runners-up), 2018
 Brunei Veteran Football Association Super Cup: 2017

References

Football clubs in Brunei
Association football clubs established in 2011